Love Is the Place is an album by Curtis Mayfield.

Track listing

Personnel
Curtis Mayfield - vocals, guitar
Fred Tackett, Michael Sembello - guitar
Dennis Belfield - bass
David Loeb - keyboards
Paulinho Da Costa - percussion
Carlos Vega - drums
Efrain Toro - marimba, vibraphone
Sam Small - Theremin
Julia Tillman Waters, Luther Waters, Maxine Willard Waters, Oren Waters, Dino Fekaris - backing vocals
Gene Page - string and horn arrangements
Technical
Christopher Whorf - album design
Harry Langdon - photography

References

Curtis Mayfield albums
1982 albums
Albums arranged by Gene Page
Albums produced by Curtis Mayfield
Curtom Records albums